Royal Enfield Classic 350 and Classic 500 are models of Royal Enfield motorcycles which have been in production since 2009. The Classic series of Royal Enfield motorcycles are inspired by the Royal Enfield G2 350cc Bullet motorcycle, first produced in 1948.

First Generation Classic Series (2009-2021) 
The first generation Classic 350 and the Classic 500 feature the new unit construction engine in their 350cc and 500cc variants respectively. However the Classic 350 uses a carburettor for fuel delivery and the Classic 500 has EFI. The Classic 350 has an ammeter while the Classic 500 has a low fuel indicator light and engine check light instead of the ammeter. The ammeter on the Classic 350 is more of a vestigial remain as the modern Classic 350 has no practical use for it. In the older models with CB points, when the piston was in the top dead centre (CB points closed) then the ammeter would stay in the middle. This feature allowed the rider to use the decompression lever to move the piston to top dead center and kick starter with relative ease. Both of these models are more expensive and targeted at a market segment above the Royal Enfield Bullet 350 and the Bullet 500.

Both the Classic 350 and the Classic 500 come in a variety of color options, including; Stealth Black, Chrome, Battle Green, and Gunmetal Grey.

In 2017 Royal Enfield equipped Classic 500 models with Euro 4 compliance which included ABS brakes for front and rear and better emission control system.

In 2018 Royal Enfield released Classic 350 models with ABS in some markets. In 2019 classic 500 production is stopped and company launches new bs6 engines and dual channel abs

A final "end of build" production run of 1000 units is launched, Classic 500 Tribute Black.

First Generation Royal Enfield Classic 350 specification:

Engine

 Type single cylinder, 4 stroke, twinspark, aircooled  
 Displacement 346cc  
 Bore x stroke 70mm x 90mm  
 Compression ratio 8.5 : 1  
 Maximum power 19.1 bhp @ 5250 rpm  
 Maximum torque 28 Nm @ 4000 rpm  
 Ignition system transistorised coil ignition  
 Clutch wet, multi-plate  
 Gearbox 5 speed constant mesh  
 Lubrication wet sump  
 Engine oil 15 W 50 API, SL grade & above, JASO MA 2  
 Fuel supply UCAL 29mm Constant vacuum carburettor / electronic fuel injection (duel channel model)
 Air cleaner paper element  
 Engine start electric/kick 
 
Chassis & suspension

 Type single downtube, using engine as stressed member  
 Front suspension telescopic, 35mm forks, 130mm travel  
 Rear suspension twin gas charged shock absorbers with 5-step adjustable preload, 80mm travel 
 
Dimensions

 Wheelbase 1370 mm  
 Ground clearance 135 mm  
 Length 2160 mm  
 Width 790 mm (without mirrors)  
 Height 1090 mm (without mirrors)  
 Seat height   
 Kerb weight 195 kg (with 90% Fuel & Oil)  
 Fuel capacity 13.5 L 
 
Brakes & tyres

 Tyres Fr. 90/90 - 19 
 Tyres Rr. 110/90 - 18 
 Brakes front 280mm disc, 2-piston caliper 
 Brakes rear disc, 1-piston caliper
 Dual Channel ABS.

Electricals

 Electrical system 12 volt - DC  
 Battery 12 volt, 8 Ah  
 Head lamp 12V, H4-60/55W (halogen)  
 Tail lamp 12V, P21/5W  
 Turn signal lamp 12V, R10W X 4nos

First Generation Royal Enfield Classic 500 specification:

Engine

 Type single cylinder, 4 stroke, spark ignition, aircooled, fuel injection  
 Displacement 499cc  
 Bore x stroke 84mm x 90mm  
 Compression ratio 8.5 : 1  
 Maximum power 27.2 bhp @ 5250 rpm  
 Maximum torque 41.3 Nm @ 4000 rpm  
 Ignition system digital electronic ignition  
 Clutch wet, multi-plate  
 Gearbox 5 speed constant mesh  
 Lubrication wet sump  
 Engine oil 15 W 50 API, SL grade & above, JASO MA 2  
 Fuel supply electronic fuel injection  
 Air cleaner paper element  
 Engine start electric/kick 
 
Chassis & suspension

 Type single downtube, using engine as stressed member  
 Front suspension telescopic, 35mm forks, 130mm travel  
 Rear suspension twin gas charged shock absorbers with 5-step adjustable preload, 80mm travel 
 
Dimensions

 Wheelbase 1360 mm 
 Ground clearance 135 mm 
 Length 2140 mm 
 Width 790 mm (without mirrors) 
 Height 1090 mm (without mirrors) 
 Seat height  
 Kerb weight 194 kg (with 90% fuel & oil) 
 Fuel capacity 13.5 L

Brakes & tyres

 Tyres Fr. 90/90 - 19  
 Tyres Rr. 120/80 - 18  
 Brakes front 280mm disc, 2-piston caliper  
 Brakes rear 153mm drum, single lead internal expanding 
 
Electricals

 Electrical system 12 volt - DC 
 Battery 12 volt, 14 Ah 
 Head lamp 12V, 60 W / 55 W, halogen 
 Tail lamp 12V, P21/5W 
 Turn signal Lamp 12V, R10W X 4nos 
Best selling model

 Gunmetal Grey

Second Generation Classic Series (2022-) 
Eschewing the 500cc variant, the second generation Classic launched in late 2021 (for the 2022 model year) as the Classic 350 Reborn.

This model is a complete redesign, with a new engine, new chassis, new suspension, and new brakes, along with a much wider variety of cosmetics, accessories, and paint schemes.

Reception 
The global motorcycle press reviews for the redesigned Classic 350 have been favorable at launch. Critics acknowledge riding the motorcycle is "a languid, unhurried experience" as it was not designed for speed.  However, the handling, fuel economy, ergonomics, low-price, quality, and beauty of the motorcycle suggest it was "designed to be fun and friendly to a wide range of riders."

Second Generation Classic 350 Claimed Specifications

References

 
 

Classic